Hung Vuong University (HVU) is a public university in Phú Thọ Province, Vietnam. Established in 2003 as the first university in Phú Thọ Province, it is now highly renowned university in Vietnam.

References

Universities in Vietnam
Phú Thọ province